M. Kumaran (born 15 May 1966 in Elerithattu) is an Indian politician and leader of Communist Party of India. He represented Hosdurg constituency in the 11th Kerala Legislative Assembly.

References

Communist Party of India politicians from Kerala
1966 births
Living people
People from Kasaragod district
Members of the Kerala Legislative Assembly